The following lists events that happened during 1962 in the Union of Soviet Socialist Republics.

Incumbents
First Secretary of the Communist Party of the Soviet Union - Nikita Khrushchev
Chairman of the Presidium of the Supreme Soviet of the Soviet Union - Leonid Brezhnev
Chairman of the Council of Ministers of the Soviet Union - Nikita Khrushchev

Events
1962 Soviet nuclear tests
Operation Anadyr

June
1–2 June – Novocherkassk massacre
17 June – K-3 becomes the first Soviet submarine to reach the North Pole. 
30 June – Aeroflot Flight 902 crashes 28 kilometers east of Krasnoyarsk airport, killing all 84 on board.

October 
 14–28 October – The Cuban Missile Crisis occurs between the United States and Soviet Union over the deployment of Soviet ballistic missiles to Cuba.

Births
 4 January – Natalya Bochina, sprinter
 17 January – Igor Surovikin, Russian professional football coach and former player
 30 August – Alexander Litvinenko, poisoned former KGB and FSB colonel

Deaths
 19 September – Nikolai Pogodin, Soviet playwright (b. 1900)

See also
1962 in fine arts of the Soviet Union
List of Soviet films of 1962

References

 
1960s in the Soviet Union
Years in the Soviet Union
Soviet Union
Soviet Union
Soviet Union